The Battle of Trebbia or the Napoleonic Battle of the Trebbia (17–20 June 1799) was fought near the Trebbia River in northern Italy between the joint Russian and Habsburg army under Alexander Suvorov and the Republican French army of Jacques MacDonald. Though the opposing armies were approximately equal in numbers, the Austro-Russians severely defeated the French, sustaining about 6,000 casualties while inflicting losses of 12,000 to 16,500 on their enemies.

In the spring of 1799 the Habsburg and Russian armies ousted the French from much of northern Italy after the battles of Magnano and Cassano and they placed the key fortress of Mantua under siege. Assembling the French occupation forces of southern and central Italy into an army, MacDonald moved north to challenge his enemies. Rather than playing safe by moving along the west coast road, MacDonald boldly chose to move east of the Apennine Mountains, hoping to be supported by Jean Victor Marie Moreau's French army. After brushing aside a much smaller Austrian force at Modena, MacDonald's army swept west along the south bank of the Po River. Suvorov swiftly concentrated his Russians and the allied Austrians of Michael von Melas to block the French move.

On 17 July, the leading French divisions bumped into a holding force led by Peter Karl Ott von Bátorkéz along the Tidone River. Ott was rapidly reinforced by the bulk of the Austro-Russian army and the French pulled back to the Trebbia. Suvorov attacked on the 18th but the outnumbered French managed to hold off the Allied drive. On 19 June MacDonald's entire army was concentrated and he ordered an attack which was poorly coordinated and repulsed at all points. Realizing that assistance from Moreau was not forthcoming, that night MacDonald ordered the beaten French army to slip away to the south and west. On the 20th the Allies overran a French demi brigade acting as rear guard. Instead of bringing a powerful reinforcement to the hard-pressed French in northwest Italy, only the crippled remains of MacDonald's army arrived.

Due to participation of some 3,000 soldiers of the Polish Legions, the Battle of Trebbia is commemorated on the Tomb of the Unknown Soldier, Warsaw, with the inscription "TREBBIA 17 - 19 VI 1799".

Background

Coalition successes
The War of the Second Coalition in northern Italian began with the inconclusive Battle of Verona on 26 March 1799 between the Habsburg army of Paul Kray and the Republican French Army of Italy under Barthélemy Louis Joseph Schérer. The subsequent Battle of Magnano on 5 April was a clear-cut victory by Kray over the French, with the Austrians sustaining 6,000 casualties while inflicting losses of 8,000 men and 18 guns on their foes. The defeat was a crushing blow to French morale and prompted Schérer to plead with the French Directory to be relieved of command. Finding his strong position behind the Mincio River outflanked on the north by 12,000 Austrians, Schérer left 12,000 troops to hold the key fortress of Mantua, directed 1,600 more to defend Peschiera del Garda and retreated to the west on 12 April. Two days later, Alexander Suvorov arrived at Vicenza with an Imperial Russian army and assumed command of the combined Austro-Russian forces.

On 27 April, the Coalition allies led by Suvorov were victorious over Jean Victor Marie Moreau's French army at the Battle of Cassano along the Adda River. The next day at Verderio, Jean-Mathieu-Philibert Sérurier's division was surrounded and in the fighting that followed the French lost 252 men killed before the 2,700 survivors gave up. The defeats caused Moreau to fall back, leaving 2,400 men to hold the Milan citadel. On 6 May the garrison of Peschiera capitulated to Kray while on 11 May Pizzighettone and 1,500 French soldiers surrendered to Konrad Valentin von Kaim. On 12 May, Suvorov's subordinate Andrei Grigorevich Rosenberg suffered a minor setback in the Battle of Bassignana. Ferrara, Ravenna and Milan all capitulated to Austrian besieging forces on 24 May.

Meanwhile, 30,000 Allies under Suvorov moved up the north bank of the Po River toward Turin. On the morning of 26 May, Josef Philipp Vukassovich's advance guard seized Turin with its arsenal and over 300 cannons plus large stocks of ammunition. Pascal Antoine Fiorella and his 3,400-man French garrison withdrew to the citadel where they were besieged. Early June found the Allied main body of 47,087 troops under Suvorov, Rosenberg and Michael von Melas camped near Turin. Karl Joseph Hadik von Futak with 9,900 Austrians watched the Swiss mountain passes. Kray's 19,760-man corps was engaged in the Siege of Mantua, covered by 6,122 Austrians under Johann von Klenau at Ferrera. Finally, Suvorov summoned the 19,458-strong corps of Count Heinrich von Bellegarde from Switzerland to Milan where they arrived on 5 June. To face this array, Moreau counted about 25,000 soldiers in the divisions of Paul Grenier, Claude Victor-Perrin, Pierre Garnier de Laboissière at Genoa, Paul Louis Gaultier de Kervéguen at Florence and Joseph Hélie Désiré Perruquet de Montrichard at Bologna. But the Allies were aware that Jacques MacDonald had a strong French occupation force in southern and central Italy.

MacDonald's offensive

On 14 April 1799, the French Directory ordered MacDonald to help the French forces in northern Italy. Accordingly, he assembled the Army of Naples and moved north, leaving southern Italy in the hands of local forces. MacDonald reached Rome on 16 May and Florence ten days later. From there, the safest course was to use the west coast road to reach Genoa, keeping the Apennine Mountains between him and the Allies. However, MacDonald believed that the coast road was unusable for his artillery beyond Lerici and feared that Austrian columns might interfere with the operation. But perhaps the real reason was that MacDonald wished to make a theatrical entrance to the campaign by smashing his way through the Coalition allies. In order to accomplish this, he asked Moreau to march north and east to meet him near Piacenza, an impractical move that would place the Army of Italy in the midst of its enemies. After his passage across the Apennines, MacDonald hoped to crush some of the Austrian covering forces. As it moved north, the Army of Naples absorbed the divisions of Victor, Montrichard and Gaultier, bringing its total field force to 36,728 soldiers.

On 9 June Suvorov received news from Peter Karl Ott von Bátorkéz that Victor and Montrichard reinforced MacDonald and that the French captured Pontremoli. Ott commanded 5,000 soldiers that belonged to Bellegarde's corps, but were acting independently near Parma. Immediately, Suvorov ordered Ott to conduct a staged withdrawal to Stradella, but to hold that position at all hazards. The Russian commander quickly made up his mind to move east to confront MacDonald. With the exception of Kaim's division, the Austro-Russian army marched to Asti, reaching there on 11 June. The Allied troops reached the Bormida River near the French-held fortress of Alessandria on 13 June. That day, Suvorov got definite news of MacDonald's offensive. Meanwhile, a French squadron put in at Genoa on 2 June to drop off French reinforcements. Intelligence indicated that Moreau was about to descend from the mountains. Suvorov ordered Bellegarde's corps to march on Alessandria to keep an eye on Moreau while the rest of his army concentrated against MacDonald.

The Army of Naples negotiated the Apennine Mountains in four major columns. The divisions of Montrichard and Jean-Baptiste Dominique Rusca formed the easternmost column, moving from Florence to Bologna. Next to the west were the divisions of Jean-Baptiste Olivier and François Watrin, accompanied by MacDonald and advancing from Pistoia on Modena. Farther west was Jean Henri Dombrowski's division descending the Secchia River valley. The westernmost column was made up of Victor's division marching from Borgo Val di Taro down the Taro River toward Parma. Because MacDonald's offensive across the Apennines was so unlikely, it took the Austrian covering forces by surprise. These were Klenau's command southwest of Ferrara, now reduced to 3,500 men, Prince Friedrich Franz Xaver of Hohenzollern-Hechingen at Modena with 4,800 troops and Ott west of Fornovo di Taro. MacDonald planned to destroy Hohenzollern's division by pinning it with his own column while enveloping it with Dombrowski's division from the west and Rusca's division from the east. Klenau deduced the French strategy and shifted northeast behind the Panaro River to block Rusca. MacDonald lost touch with Dombrowski's command. Nevertheless, MacDonald fell on the Austrians at Modena with two divisions. On 12 June in the Battle of Modena, the French inflicted losses of 750 killed and wounded on their enemies while capturing 1,650 men, eight guns and three colors. French casualties were 400 killed and wounded and 200 captured. During the pursuit, MacDonald was set upon by a troop of French Royalist cavalry and suffered saber cuts on the head and arm before his own soldiers could finish off their enemies.

Since the fortress of Alessandria commanded the only crossing of the Bormida, the Austro-Russian main body waited on a pontoon train which finally arrived on 15 June. At 5:00 pm the span was in place and Suvorov's army crossed and marched all night to reach Castelnuovo Scrivia on the morning of the 16th. After only three hours of rest, the soldiers continued the forced march during the day to their bivouac between Casteggio and Casatisma. In a period of 24 hours the Allied army covered . To provide security for his right flank, Suvorov detached Mikhail Mikhailovich Veletsky with one battalion of the Jung-Baden Musketeer Regiment, 50 Cossacks and 80 dragoons from the Karaczay Regiment. Allowing for the possibility of defeat, the Russian army commander ordered the Po to be bridged at Mezzana Corti for the main army and Valenza for Bellegarde's corps. By this time, Bellegarde and 14,500 troops arrived to maintain the siege of Alessandria and contain Moreau. To keep MacDonald from raising the siege of Mantua, Kray manned the north bank of the Po with several thousand troops.

On 16 June at 10:00 am, MacDonald's vanguard arrived near Piacenza and began pressing Ott's command. Suvorov reiterated his orders for Ott to make a fighting retreat to the Stradella defile. By this time Austrian military engineer Albert Johann de Best got the Piacenza citadel into a defensible state after eight days of work; two or three companies of the Fröhlich Regiment were assigned to garrison it. Victor's division led the French attack on Ott as Rusca's soldiers edged toward the south as if to flank the Austrians out of position. That night, Suvorov's chief of staff Johann Gabriel Chasteler de Courcelles rushed toward Ott's position with 100 dragoons of the Karaczay Regiment plus a half-battery of horse artillery. Following behind was an improvised force including the Wouwermanns Grenadier Battalion, three battalions of the Fröhlich Regiment, the remainder of the Karaczay Regiment and one and one-half batteries of horse artillery. If Ott could hold out along the Tidone River, it would allow ample space for the Austro-Russian army to deploy between the Po and the mountain spurs to the south. If Ott were forced back into the narrow Stradella position, it would be difficult for the Allies to form a line of battle and might even cause a rout.

Forces

Allied Army

The Austro-Russian army commanded by Field Marshal Suvorov was organized into three columns on 18 June. General Rosenberg led the mostly Russian First and Second Columns while General der Kavallerie Melas directed the mostly Austrian Third Column. The Austrian forces numbered 9,851 foot and 4,586 horse while the Russians counted 16,219 infantry and 2,000 Cossacks. These numbers amounted to 32,656 and did not include artillerymen. The figures in brackets represent Austrian casualties. The First Column on the right was headed by an Advance Guard under Major General Pyotr Bagration which included the Dendrygin, Kalemin, Lomonosov and Sanaev Combined Grenadier Battalions, two battalions of the Bagration Jäger Regiment, Grekov and Posdeev Cossack Regiments and six squadrons of the Austrian Karaczay Dragoon Regiment Nr. 4 [62]. Lieutenant General Yakov Ivanovich Povalo-Schveikovsky led an infantry division consisting of two battalions of the Rosenberg Grenadier Regiment, one battalion each of the Dalheim and Schveikovsky Musketeer Regiments and six squadrons of the Austrian Lobkowitz Dragoon Regiment Nr. 10 [107].

Rosenberg personally accompanied the Second Column in the center. The division commander was Lieutenant General Förster and his infantry was made up of two battalions each of the Miloradovich and Tyrtov Musketeer Regiments and one battalion each of the Baranovsky, Förster and Jung-Baden Musketeer Regiments. The cavalry contingent was formed from the Molchanov Cossack Regiment and six squadrons of the Austrian Levenehr Dragoon Regiment Nr. 14 [76].

The Third Column under General der Kavallerie Melas was made up of a division under Feldmarschall-Leutnant Ott and a reserve under Feldmarschall-Leutnant Michael von Fröhlich with attached artillery [64]. Ott's division included four battalions of the Nádasdy Nr. 39 [565] and two battalions of the Mittrowsky Nr. 40 [198] Infantry Regiments, the Mihanovich Serbian Free Battalion [260], the 6th Battalion of the Banater Grenz Infantry Regiment [115], six companies of the D'Aspre Jäger Battalion, the Semernikov Cossack Regiment and six squadrons of the Archduke Joseph Hussar Regiment Nr. 2 [152]. Fröhlich's reserve consisted of the Morzin [29], Paar [109], Pertusi [106], Schiaffinatti [37], Weber [62] and Wouwermanns [102] Grenadier Battalions. A second source stated that there were 17,000 Russians and 20,000 Austrians present and added three battalions of the Fröhlich Nr. 28 Infantry Regiment, six squadrons of the Württemberg Dragoon Regiment Nr. 8 [2] and listed seven rather than six Austrian grenadier battalions. This source also named as brigade commanders, Johann I Joseph, Prince of Liechtenstein for the grenadiers, Ferdinand Johann von Morzin for the Nádasdy, Mittrowsky and Württemberg Regiments and Friedrich Heinrich von Gottesheim for the D'Aspre, Mihanovich, Banater and Archduke Joseph units.

French Army

In MacDonald's Army of Naples Chef de brigade Victor Léopold Berthier served as chief of staff, Chef de bataillon Jacques Bardenet as chief of artillery and Jean-Louis Dubreton as commissary officer. In the 8 June order of battle that follows, the figures in parentheses are unit strengths. The Advanced Guard was led by General of Brigade Jean-Baptiste Salme and included the 11th Line (1,390), 12th Line (1,250) and 15th Light (1,340) Infantry Demi-Brigades, a detachment of the 25th Chasseurs à Cheval Regiment (85), the 6th Company of the 8th Foot Artillery Regiment (34) and the 3rd Company of the 1st Sapper Battalion (29). The 1st Division was commanded by General of Division Olivier and consisted of the 30th Line (1,508) and 73rd Line (2,009) Infantry Demi-Brigades, 7th Chasseurs à Cheval (321) and 19th Chasseurs à Cheval (314) Regiments and gunners and sappers (311). The 2nd Division was directed by General of Division Rusca and comprised the 17th Light (1,880), 55th Line (886) and 97th Line (1,760) Infantry Demi-Brigades, 16th Dragoon (488) and 19th Dragoon (330) Regiments and artillerists and sappers (116).

The 3rd Division was supervised by General of Division Montrichard and was made up of the 3rd (or 2nd) Line (730), 21st Line (1,000), 68th Line (900) and 5th Light (1,900) Infantry Demi-Brigades, 1st Cavalry (263), 12th Dragoon (400), 11th Hussar (250), Cisalpine Dragoon (100) and Cisalpine Hussar (308) Regiments and gunners and sappers (112). The 4th Division was commanded by General of Division Watrin and consisted of the 62nd Line (3,420) and 78th Light (2,120) Infantry Demi-Brigade, 25th Chasseurs à Cheval Regiment (260) and artillerists (33). The 5th Division was directed by General of Division Dombrowski and comprised the 1st Polish Legion (2,000), 8th Light Infantry Demi-Brigade (893) and Polish Cavalry (500).

The remaining infantry division was led by General of Division Victor and included the 5th Line (1,300), 39th Line (1,225), 92nd Line (1,240), 93rd Line (1,265) and 99th Line (1,320) Infantry Demi-Brigades and 15th Chasseurs à Cheval Regiment (400). There were also 526 men assigned to the artillery park. A second authority placed the 12th Line in Olivier's division rather than Salme's Advanced Guard, specified that the 17th in Rusca's division was Light Infantry, put the 2nd Line instead of the 3rd Line in Montrichard's division and listed different unit totals in some divisions. This second source gave the following division strengths for the end of May: Salme 2,997, Olivier 5,826, Rusca 5,397, Montrichard 5,773, Watrin 4,880, Dombrowski 3,555 and Victor 6,750. This yielded a strength of 30,980 infantry, 3,616 cavalry and 1,088 artillerymen and sappers for a 35,684 grand total. From this, losses from the Battle of Modena and other causes must be deducted.

Battle

Tidone River - 17 June

The Tidone River runs north into the Po west of Piacenza. Like the Tidone, the bed of the Trebbia is filled with white stones. On 17 June at 8:00 am the French opened their attack against Ott's positions behind the Tidone. On hand were a total of 18,700 soldiers including Salme's Advance Guard. The French divisions were deployed with Victor on the right, Rusca in the center and Dombrowski on the left. Because of the wounds he sustained at Modena, MacDonald was bedridden in the village of Borgo San Antonio to the west of Piacenza. As senior officer Victor should have assumed tactical control of the fight, but he stayed in Piacenza, resulting in poor coordination of the French effort. Nevertheless, the determined initial assault ousted the D'Aspre Jägers from their west-bank positions in the hamlets of Agazzino, Pontetidone and Veratto di Sopra. As Dombrowski's troops mounted a flank attack to the south, the troops of Victor's division fought their way to the village of Sarmato where they were held up by an Austrian artillery battery and two battalions of the Nádasdy Regiment. Chasteler was with Ott when the French attack started. He urged Ott to hold as long as possible and went back to find that his task force was hurrying on its way. At 1:00 pm Chasteler's men arrived and were thrown into the fight. Nevertheless, at 3:00 pm the French overran both Sarmato and its defending battery, forcing Ott's troops back to a position in front of Castel San Giovanni.

Soon afterward Melas arrived with three battalions of Austrians foot and some squadrons of the Archduke Joseph Hussars. Suvorov inspired the Russian columns by suddenly appearing at odd places along the line of march. If inspiration failed, Cossacks were employed to prod stragglers back into line. Chasteler's units hustled off to the south to block a turning movement by Dombrowski's division. The Bagration Jäger Regiment veered off to the north while the four Russian combined grenadier battalions were committed to battle near Castel San Giovanni. Despite the odds turning against them, the French continued to mount spirited attacks. Gradually the Allies massed in two battle lines in front of Castel San Giovanni. By the end of the day, 30,656 Austrian and Russian troops were present to face the now-outnumbered French. Finally, the Allies recaptured Sarmato and the abandoned Austrian cannons, compelling the French to retreat. The French fell back stubbornly, taking advantage of plentiful cover to repulse Austrian cavalry charges. Salme's Advanced Guard covered the last stages of the withdrawal, forming square at Ca' del Bosco on the northern part of the battlefield. The shooting ended by 9:00 pm. The French suffered losses of about 1,000 killed and wounded plus 1,200 more captured. Allied casualties are not given.

Trebbia River - 18 June

Unexpectedly confronted by a large Austro-Russian army, MacDonald was in a dilemma. He believed that his 22,000 available soldiers were outnumbered and ought to retreat, but he anticipated that Moreau might soon arrive to pitch into the Allied rear. So he hoped to hold out until his last divisions could arrive on the field. MacDonald was also aware of the presence of a force under Jean François Cornu de La Poype that was in position to threaten the Allied south flank. On the 18th, Veletsky's detached force surprised La Poype's 1,500 French and 2,000 Genoese at Bobbio, sending them fleeing back to Genoa. On morning of 18 June the injured MacDonald inspected his army. He found his men ready to fight and the enemy inactive. Meanwhile, Suvorov and Chasteler planned to throw three columns at the French, with the main strength on the right to break down MacDonald's flank by advancing from the Tidone to the Trebbia and finally all the way to the Nure, the next river to the east. With luck, the French would be driven back against the Po. The First Column on the right was headed by Bagration's Advance Guard followed by Schveikovsky's division. The Second Column in the center was made up of Förster's division. The Third Column included the divisions of Ott and Fröhlich. Ott was ordered to drive straight ahead to the Trebbia supported by his colleague. At some point Fröhlich's grenadiers were supposed to reinforce the right flank in order to give more weight to its attack.

Suvorov's desire to start the attack at 7:00 am proved to be impractical due to the Allied soldiers' exhaustion, so it was put off until 11:00 am. Scouts reported that the French were defending behind the Trebbia with advanced positions near the villages of San Nicolò, Gragnano Trebbiense and Casaliggio, from north to south. Bagration's Advance Guard forded the Tidone and attacked Dombrowski's Polish Legion south of Casaliggio at 2:00 pm, achieving some surprise. Coming from the south, a Polish battalion threatened the Russian rear, but it was quickly hemmed in by Russian infantry, the Austrian Karaczay Dragoons and Cossacks and 230 men were forced to lay down their arms. An alert French staff officer, Pierre Edmé Gautherin brought the divisions of Rusca and Victor to the west bank of the Trebbia where they stopped and drove back Bagration's troops. Rosenberg brought Schveikovsky's division into the fight while Suvorov personally rallied the shaken Russian infantry. The Russians presently gained the upper hand and compelled Rusca to pull back to the east bank of the Trebbia, which his men accomplished while maintaining their ranks. The fighting in the center began when the Levenehr Dragoons and Molchanov Cossacks clashed with some French horsemen and drove them back. Starting at 5:00 pm, Förster slowly pressed back the right wing of Victor's division. Finally the French evacuated Gragnano and fell back across the Trebbia.

Salme's Advanced Guard, which was posted near Sant' Imento north of the highway, was unchallenged most of the day. At about 2:30 pm, the divisions of Montrichard and Olivier crossed the Trebbia and marched to Salme's support. Seeing these French reinforcements in his front, Melas decided not to release Fröhlich's division. The Third Column commander sent Ott forward at 6:00 pm and the Austrians easily brushed aside Salme's outnumbered unit. Together, Ott and Fröhlich pushed Montrichard and Olivier back beyond the Trebbia by evening. That night in a bizarre operation, Rosenberg took two Russian grenadier battalions across the Trebbia south of Gossolengo. They somehow penetrated the French lines as far as Settima where they routed a French detachment and liberated some prisoners. At 3:00 am, Rosenberg's expedition headed back to the west bank, again without arousing any French sentries. Four squadrons of the Karaczay Dragoons mounted a similar expedition but were detected and driven off by musketry. Both groups missed the pointless battle that occurred earlier in the evening. Hearing what they believed to be Moreau's artillery, three French battalions mounted an extemporaneous attack at 9:30 pm, surprising an Austrian battalion. Melas called up reinforcements from his own and Förster's divisions while Prince Liechtenstein charged into the fray with the Lobkowitz Dragoons. The artillery of both sides opened up on the melee, causing many friendly fire casualties. After strenuous efforts, the leaders of both sides managed to wind down the senseless fighting by 11:00 pm.

Trebbia River - 19 June

Chasteler sent orders for the Allied army to begin the assault at 6:00 am on 19 June. However, the plan was not delivered to Melas until 11:00 am. In the meantime, Melas noticed the presence of strong enemy forces at the north end of the battleline and sent 12 artillery pieces to the west bank of the Trebbia to blast the French positions. Two French battalions crept forward to deal with the threat, but they were discovered and driven off by the murderously effective fire of two masked cannons. Also during the morning, the French set up a battery of 10 to 12 guns and began to hammer Förster's positions. This was apparently to cover a shift to the south by a body of French troops. The delay also affected the Russian forces and Suvorov began issuing orders at 11:00 am. Meanwhile, MacDonald determined to launch an assault, putting his faith in the French soldier's enthusiasm for the attack and his troops' good morale. He still believed his army was outnumbered but he hoped to preempt an Allied assault. In the south Rusca and Victor were directed to attack side-by-side near Casaliggio, supported by an outflanking move by Dombrowski via Rivalta. Montrichard was ordered to cross the Trebbia near Gragnano in the center while Olivier was instructed to crack the Allied line farther north near San Nicolò. On the extreme right flank, Watrin and Salme were told to seize Calendasco and turn the Allied left flank.

Chasteler spotted Dombrowski's outflanking column and directed Bagration's troops against it. Dombrowski's division seized Rivalta and advanced up the Trebbia's west bank as far as the hamlet of Canetto before they ran into the Russians. Accompanied in person by Suvorov, the Russians defeated their mostly Polish opponents with serious losses and forced them to retreat to the east bank. Rusca's initial advance was blunted by the fire of 14 artillery pieces belonging to Schveikovsky's division. Farther north, Victor's division was repulsed by a combination of Schveikovsky's left wing and Förster's division and withdrew to the French-held east bank. But with Bagration's forces pulled to the south by Dombrowski's ill-fated attack, Rusca's men found a gap in the Allied line south of Casaliggio. The French infantry charged across the Trebbia while a horse artillery battery mauled the Rosenberg Grenadier Regiment. Suvorov appeared on the scene to rally his Russians. Rosenberg swung the left wing of Schveikovsky's division to face the northern edge of Rusca's breakthrough while Bagration hurried north to hit the southern edge. At the same time, Chasteler borrowed four battalions from Förster and brought them to the scene. The combined attack forced Rusca's division to retire to the east bank. The Russians tried to follow up their success but Rusca's men repelled their attacks and the fighting in the south ended around 7:00 pm.

The assault in the center was delayed because of the tardy arrival of Montrichard's division. Its 5th Light Infantry crossed the river and deployed into line but was hit by a devastating volley from an Austrian grenadier battalion. Montrichard's other units advanced in columns which were out of touch with each other. When Fröhlich's grenadiers and Förster's division counterattacked, Montrichard's division dissolved and its soldiers took to their heels. The grenadier battalion was swamped by fleeing Frenchmen, but it managed to keep its cohesion until some Russian infantry cut their way through to the rescue. Olivier's assault was preceded by a lightning cavalry charge around noon that swept the west bank clear of Austrians. The infantry crossed in the cavalry's wake and soon captured San Nicolò and two guns. Hearing cannon fire, Liechtenstein went forward to check on the situation and found a crowd of Austrian troops running away from Olivier's assault. He immediately went back to his command and led two squadrons each of the Lobkowitz and Levenehr Dragoons and one squadron of the Archduke Joseph Hussars against Olivier's south flank. Having disposed of Montrichard's division earlier, the Allies were free to mass against Olivier's division and eventually throw it back to the Trebbia's east bank. The Wouwermanns Grenadier Battalion recaptured two Austrian 12-pound cannons.

Around the same time that Olivier made his attack, Salme's Advanced Guard and Watrin's division, which had previously been in reserve, crossed the Trebbia on the far right flank. Moving in two bodies, the French force brushed aside the Austrian outpost line. The right thrust reached Ca' Pernici on the Po's south bank while the left thrust carried almost to Calendasco. Here Watrin paused because the noises from Olivier's fight were not encouraging. By this time, Melas had Olivier on the run and wished to attack across the Trebbia. Hearing of the Watrin-Salme incursion, the Austrian general was forced to deal with it first. Melas sent Liechtenstein with a task force composed of one squadron of the Lobkowitz Dragoons, two squadrons of the Archduke Joseph Hussars, 200 Cossacks and nine companies of infantry. Meanwhile, an artillery battery detached from the Mantua siege corps under the command of Colonel Kinsky unlimbered on the north bank of the Po. The Austrian guns proceeded to bombard their enemies, encouraging them in their decision to recross the Trebbia though the Austrians made prisoners of 300 French. The firing ended in the northern sector about 9:00 pm. The French maintained a firm grip on the west bank of the Trebbia, but MacDonald's division commanders were not able to give him any estimate of their remaining strength. In a scene of horror, thousands of dead and wounded soldiers littered the bed of the Trebbia while Piacenza's Austrian garrison blindly fired cannons into the night. Realizing that neither Moreau nor La Poype were coming to his assistance, MacDonald issued the orders to retreat at 10:00 pm. As soon as the engineers bridged the Nure River, the artillery and wagon train were sent across, followed by the infantry starting about midnight.

Nure River - 20 June
Suvorov determined to finish with the French so he ordered a new attack at 4:00 am on 20 June. When the Allied forces reached the west bank they found MacDonald's army gone. The French abandoned 7,183 wounded men in Piacenza which suggested that their losses may have been as high as 12,000 when the killed, transportable wounded and captured were counted. The Russians reported 681 killed and 2,073 wounded for a total of 2,754 while the Austrians admitted losing 254 killed, 1,903 wounded and 500 missing for a total of 2,657. Historian Christopher Duffy rounded these figures up to 6,000 Allied casualties. Digby Smith reported similar Allied losses, though he included three Russian generals wounded. From a total of 33,000 French, he estimated losses as 2,000 killed, 7,500 wounded (most of whom became prisoners) plus 7,000 men, seven guns and eight colors captured. Gunther E. Rothenberg gave Allied losses as 5,000 killed and wounded and 500 captured out of 20,000 Russians and 17,000 Austrians. He stated French losses as 9,500 killed and wounded and 7,000 captured out of 33,000. R. Ernest Dupuy and Trevor N. Dupuy rounded the losses to 10,000 French and 7,000 Allied, but asserted that 5,000 French became prisoners during the retreat that followed. French General of Division Alexis Aimé Pierre Cambray was mortally wounded during the battle and died 2 July.<ref>{{cite web|author=Broughton, Tony |publisher=The Napoleon Series |access-date=30 November 2014 |year=2006 |url=http://www.napoleon-series.org/research/frenchgenerals/c_frenchgenerals7.html |title=Generals Who Served in the French Army during the Period 1789-1815: Cabannes de Puymisson to Cazals}}</ref>

The Austrians advanced into Piacenza where they found the wounded generals Olivier, Rusca and Salme along with the other non-transportable French wounded. Melas secured the town with Fröhlich's division while launching Ott in pursuit. However, Ott was held up at the Nure by a full French division. Farther south at San Giorgio Piacentino the Karaczay Dragoons charged the 17th Light Infantry but were rudely repulsed and the French gunners knocked out two of the Austrian cannons. Bagration's Advance Guard came up and Chasteler deployed it for a full-scale attack on San Giorgio. Intense musketry held off the Bagration and Miller Jägers on the flanks but the combined grenadiers won a foothold in the village. Suvorov was forced to commit part of the divisions of Förster and Schveikovsky before the French regiment was overwhelmed. A total of 1,099 French soldiers surrendered along with six guns and three colors.

Result
The Army of Naples withdrew southeast toward Parma where 200 wounded soldiers were abandoned. The Allies pursued the French on 21 June, reaching Fiorenzuola where they rested the next day. Suvorov determined from captured dispatches that MacDonald's mangled army was no longer a threat to northern Italy and marched the Allied army back west on the 23rd, hoping to catch Moreau between himself and Belegarde. Ott with 7,000 foot, 2,000 horse and 15 guns continued the pursuit. MacDonald ordered Montrichard's division to the east where it was used to form some garrisons which were subsequently captured. One battalion of Warasdiner Grenz and one squadron of the Bussy Mounted Jägers tried to block MacDonald's retreat but were crushed on 24 June at Sassuolo south of Modena. By 28 June the Army of Naples'' was back at Pistoia where it stayed for several days before marching to the west coast in early July. The still ailing MacDonald was shipped off to France and replaced in command by Laurent Gouvion Saint-Cyr. The garrisons in south and central Italy were picked off one-by-one by the Allies. Naples surrendered on 15 June, Fort Elmo in Naples harbor on 11 July, Capua on 28 July, Gaeta on 1 August, Rome on 29 September and Ancona on 13 November 1799. Even the French-held fortresses of northern Italy fell rapidly. Turin capitulated on 20 June, Bologna on 3 July, Fort Urbano on 10 July, Alessandria on 22 July and Mantua on 28 July. The next major engagement was the Battle of Novi on 15 August 1799.

Notes

References

Sources

 Clausewitz, Carl von. Napoleon Absent, Coalition Ascendant: The 1799 Campaign in Italy and Switzerland, Volume 1. Trans and ed. Nicholas Murray and Christopher Pringle. Lawrence, Kansas: University Press of Kansas (2020).

External links
 

Conflicts in 1799
Battles of the French Revolutionary Wars
Battles of the War of the Second Coalition
Battles involving Austria
Battles involving France
Battles involving Russia
1799 in Italy
Alexander Suvorov
Trebbia